The 1837 Newfoundland general election was held in 1837 to elect members of the 2nd General Assembly of Newfoundland in Newfoundland Colony. The results of the previous election had been set aside by Henry John Boulton after he discovered some of the writs from the previous election had not been marked with the official seal. A number of Liberal reformers who had been elected in 1836 did not run for reelection. However, reformers continued to dominate the assembly.

Results by party

Elected members
 Bonavista Bay District
 Hugh A. Emerson Conservative
 Burin District
 Henry G. Butler Liberal
 Conception Bay District
 Peter Brown Liberal
 John McCarthy Liberal
 Anthony Godfrey Liberal
 James Power Liberal
 Ferryland District
 Peter Winser Liberal
 Fortune Bay District
 William B. Row Conservative
 Placentia and St. Mary's District
 Patrick Doyle Liberal
 John V. Nugent Liberal
 St. John's District
 William Carson Liberal (speaker)
 John Kent Liberal
 Patrick Morris Liberal
 Trinity Bay District
 Thomas Fitzgibbon Moore Conservative
 Fogo District
 Edward James Dwyer Conservative

Notes:
 Patrick Morris was elected in both Ferryland and St. John's

References 
 
 

1837
1837 elections in North America
1837 elections in Canada
Pre-Confederation Newfoundland
1837 in Newfoundland